Four80East is a Canadian electro jazz ensemble from Toronto, Ontario, with Rob DeBoer (keyboards, bass and guitar) and Tony Grace (percussion); accompanied by various session musicians. Although Four80East began as a studio concept, they have evolved into a live act. Their music is melodic with strong bass rhythms.

History
Four80East began as a studio project when DeBoer and Grace, who had been writing, arranging and producing for other artists on their Boomtang Records label, put together material of their own and released it as The Album, in 1997.  The Album was well received by critics and the public alike.  

The pair's second album Nocturnal, was released in 2001; DeBoer and Grace wrote all of the songs for the album, and enlisted  tenor saxophonist Jon Stewart, flutist Andrew McPherson, and trumpeter Ivana Santilli to contribute instrumentals.

The album Round 3 came out in 2002,  and included contributions from harmonica player Carlos Del Junco. 

Their fourth album, En Route, containing instrumental dance music, was released in 2007.  

Four80East's fifth CD, Roll On, came out in 2009, followed by a sixth, Off Duty, in 2012. 

Four80East LIVE, a collection of 15 select songs recorded from three different shows, was released in early 2014. 

The group is also featured on the 2007 compilation album, The Weather Channel Presents: The Best of Smooth Jazz.

Band members
Permanent members
 Rob DeBoer – keyboards, bass and guitar
 Tony Grace – percussion

Discography
Studio Albums
1997:  The Album
2001:  Nocturnal
2002:  Round 3
2007:  En Route
2009:  Roll On
2012:  Off Duty
2015:  Positraction featuring the hit single, “Cookie Strut”.
2018:  Four on the Floor (ep - 5 tracks) 
2020:  Straight Round
2021:  Mixed Up (remixes)
Live Albums
2014:  Four80East LIVE

References

External links
Four80East Official site
Four80East at Amazon.com
Four80East on Facebook

Musical groups established in 1997
Musical groups from Toronto
Canadian jazz ensembles
Acid jazz ensembles
Canadian electronic music groups
1997 establishments in Ontario
Native Language Music artists